Erwin Kräutler C.Pp.S. (born 12 July 1939 in Koblach, Austria) is a Roman Catholic bishop who headed the Territorial Prelature of Xingu from 1981 until 2015.

Biography

Erwin Kräutler was born in Koblach, Austria, on 12 July 1939. As a teenager he was drawn to the Catholic Youth Worker movement and the model offered by French worker priests, as well as the vocation of his uncle, a missionary in Brazil. He was ordained a priest on 3 July 1965 and became a missionary in Brazil later that year and has spent his entire career there. He became a Brazilian citizen in 1978, retaining his Austrian citizenship.

On 7 November 1980, Pope John Paul II appointed him coadjutor prelate of Xingu. Upon the resignation of Eurico Kräutler, his uncle, he became Prelate of Xingu on 2 September 1981. The prelature encompasses an area the size of Germany; it has 600 Catholic communities served by eighteen priests. Between 1983 and 1991 and again beginning in 2006 he served as President of the Indigenous Missionary Council of the Brazilian Catholic Church.

In 1992, when Archbishop Georg Eder of Salzburg cancelled his scheduled speech at the university there, he spoke to an overflow crowd instead at Vienna City Hall at the invitation of the Mayor, Helmut Zilk.

In 2004, the German think tank GLOBALART gave him their annual award. In 2010 he received the Right Livelihood Award for his defense of and advocacy for the rights of indigenous peoples. In the 1980s, he helped secure the inclusion of indigenous peoples' rights in the Brazilian constitution. He also plays an important role in opposing the Belo Monte Dam. Opponents of his activism have responded with violence on several occasions. For supporting striking workers in 1983 he was arrested and beaten by military police. An attempted assassination staged as a car accident left him badly injured in 1987. He was given police protections when targeted with death threats for opposing the Belo Monte dam.

On 14 April 2014, he met with Pope Francis and provided him with information on Amazonia to his work on the ecology-themed encyclical Laudato si' (2015). He published his memoirs in 2014, Mein Leben für Amazonien (My Life for Amazonia).

He retired at the age of 76 upon the appointment of his successor in Xingu on 23 December 2015.

On 8 March 2018, Pope Francis appointed him to the 15-person council responsible for planning the Synod of Bishops for the Pan-Amazon region. On 9 October 2019, the third day of that Synod, Kräutler said that thousands of communities in the region "do not celebrate the Eucharist except perhaps one, two or three times a year", that he and his colleagues did not oppose celibacy but "just want these brothers and sisters of ours not to have just a celebration of the word but also the celebration of the Eucharist". He expressed his own support for the ordination of women but doubted it had widespread support. He also told reporters he thought than two-thirds of synod participants "are in favor of the ordination of married men" and that "many of the bishops are in favor of the ordination of female deacons".

Notes

References

External links 

Biography on Catholic Hierarchy 

1939 births
Living people
Roman Catholic missionaries in Brazil
20th-century Austrian Roman Catholic theologians
Austrian emigrants to Brazil
20th-century Roman Catholic bishops in Brazil
21st-century Roman Catholic bishops in Brazil
University of Salzburg alumni
Liberation theologians
Austrian Roman Catholic missionaries
21st-century Austrian Roman Catholic theologians
Roman Catholic bishops of Xingu-Altamira